Peter Buck is the debut solo album from Peter Buck. It has received positive critical reception.

Recording and promotion
The album was initially announced by long-time collaborator Scott McCaughey in an interview with KIRO-FM on March 14, 2012, with an off-hand remark that Buck had been recording with no firm plans for a release. The collaborators spent four days in the studio, recording and mixing. On May 26, 2012, Buck performed with Joseph Arthur, playing the song "10 Million B.C." live and contributing vocals, which he had rarely done in his three decades with R.E.M. An unfinished studio recording of the song was broadcast on WMFU's Diane's Kamikaze Fun Machine by guest DJ Steve Wynn on June 14, 2012. McCaughey e-mailed Seattle Weekly on August 14, 2012, to confirm that the album was being released on vinyl only through local label Mississippi Records with no firm release date. Buck formed the group Richard M. Nixon to preview the material live alongside McCaughey's band Young Fresh Fellows.

Critical reception

 Editors at AllMusic Guide scored this album four out of five stars, with critic Stephen Thomas Erlewine praising "how filthy it feels" and "a back-to-basics move for Buck".

Track listing
All songs composed by Peter Buck

Side one
"10 Million BC" – 3:04
"It's Alright" – 3:34
"Some Kind of Velvet Sunday Morning" – 4:15
"Travel Without Arriving" – 4;13
"Migraine" – 2:17
"Give Me Back My Wig" – 2:50
"Nothing Matters" – 3:38

Side two
"So Long Johnny" – 2:30
"L.V.M.F." – 1:23
"Nothing Means Nothing" – 3:43
"Hard Old World" – 4:02
"Nowhere No Way" – 2:35
"Vaso Loco" – 1:57
"I'm Alive" – 4:08

The track "L.V.M.F.", featuring the sampled voice of Sonny Boy Williamson, appears only on the first pressing of 2,000 copies due to licensing restrictions, and was omitted from the repress of the LP in 2013 – which has the track name blacked out on the back cover.

Personnel

Peter Buck – guitar, piano, vocals
Jenny Conlee – percussion
Lenny Kaye – guitar
Scott McCaughey – vocals, guitar
Mike Mills – vocals, bass guitar
Bill Rieflin – drums
Corin Tucker – vocals

See also

2012 in American music
List of 2012 albums

References

External links

Press release from R.E.M.'s site
Preview of the unfinished version of "10 Million B.C." from R.E.M.'s website
Preview of the studio version of "10 Million B.C." from R.E.M.'s website
Mississippi Records catalogue
Peter Buck at Rate Your Music

2012 debut albums
Albums produced by Peter Buck
Peter Buck albums
R.E.M.
Mississippi Records albums